The 1883–84 season was tenth season of competitive football by Rangers.

Overview
Rangers played a total matches during the 1883–84 season.

Results
All results are written with Rangers' score first.

Scottish Cup

Appearances

See also
 1883–84 in Scottish football
 1883–84 Scottish Cup

External links
1883–84 Rangers F.C.Results

Rangers F.C. seasons
Rangers